Elena Andreyevna Shvarts (17 May 1948 – 11 March 2010) was a Russian poet.

Born in Leningrad, where she lived her entire life, Shvarts attended the University of Tartu, where her first poems were published in the university newspaper in 1973. After that, however, she did not publish for another decade in her own country; her work began to appear in émigré journals in 1978, and she published two collections of poetry (Tantsuyushchii David and Stikhi) and a novel in verse (Trudy i dni Lavinii) abroad before a collection (Storony sveta) was allowed to be published in the Soviet Union, "bringing her immediate recognition both at home and abroad."
Birdsong escaping from a cage is a metaphor running through her work.

Bibliography

Russian

Poems

 «Танцующий Давид» (Dancing David) (New York City: Russica Publishers, 1985)
 «Стихи» (Verses) (Paris: Беседа, 1987)
 «Труды и дни Лавинии, монахини из ордена Обрезания Сердца» (Labours and days of Lavinia) (Ann Arbor: Ardis Publishers, 1987)
 «Стороны света» (Cardinal direction) (Leningrad: Sovetsky Pisatel, the Leningrad Department, 1989)
 «Стихи» (Verses) (Л.: Ассоциация «Новая литература», 1990)
 «Лоция ночи. Книга поэм» (Rutter of the Night, a book of long poems) (СПб.: Советский писатель, Санкт-Петербургское отделение, 1993)
 «Песня птицы на дне морском» (A Song of the Bird at the Sea-Bottom) (СПб.: Пушкинский фонд, 1995)
 «Mundus Imaginalis» (СПб.: Эзро, 1996)
 «Западно-восточный ветер» (The West-Ost Wind) (СПб.: Пушкинский фонд, 1997)
 «Соло на раскалённой трубе» (The Solo on the fiery Trumpet) (СПб.: Пушкинский фонд, 1998)
 «Стихотворения и поэмы» (Verses and Long Poems) (СПб.: Инапресс, 1999)
 «Дикопись последнего времени» (The wild Script of the last Time) (СПб.: Пушкинский фонд, 2001)
 «Трость скорописца» (The Walking-Stick of the Tachygraph) (СПб.: Пушкинский фонд, 2004)
 «Вино седьмого года» (The Wine of the seventh Year) (СПб.: Пушкинский фонд, 2007)

Prose and essay

 Определение в дурную погоду (Definition while the Weather is Bad) (СПб.: Пушкинский фонд, 1997)
 Видимая сторона жизни (The visible Side of the Life) (СПб.: Лимбус, 2003)

Collected Works

 «Сочинения Елены Шварц» (Collected Works by Elena Shvarts, Volumes I-II), тт. I-II (СПб.: Пушкинский фонд, 2002, verses and long poems)
 «Сочинения Елены Шварц» (Collected Works by Elena Shvarts, Volumes III-IV), тт. III-IV (СПб.: Пушкинский фонд, 2008, verses, prose and a theatrical play)

Translations

 Paradise: selected poems. Newcastle upon Tyne: Bloodaxe, 1993
 Ein kaltes Feuer brennt an den Knochen entlang ... : Gedichte. Chemnitz; Berlin; St. Petersburg: Oberbaum, 1997
 Das Blumentier: Gedichte. Düsseldorf: Grupello-Verl., 1999
 La vierge chevauchant Venise et moi sur son épaule: poèmes. Évian: Alidades, 2003
 Olga Martynova, Jelena Schwarz. Rom liegt irgendwo in Russland. Zwei russische Dichterinnen im lyrischen Dialog über Rom. Russisch / Deutsch. Aus dem Russischen von Elke Erb und Olga Martynova. Wien: Edition per procura, 2006
 Birdsong on the seabed. Tarset: Bloodaxe Books, 2008
 Werken en dagen van de non-Lavinia. Amsterdam, 2009

Anthologies

 Child of Europe: A New Anthology of East European Poetry, edited by Michael March (London: Penguin, 1990)
 Twentieth-Century Russian Poetry, edited by John Glad and Daniel Weissbort (Iowa City: University of Iowa Press, 1992)
 Contemporary Russian Poetry: A Bilingual Anthology, ed. Gerald Smith (Bloomington and Indianapolis: Indiana University Press, 1993)
 Third Wave: The New Russian Poetry, eds. Kent Johnson and Stephen M. Ashby (Ann Arbor: University of Michigan Press, 1992)
 In the Grip of Strange Thoughts: Russian Poetry in the New Era, ed. J. Kates (Zephyr Press, 1999)

References

External links
Bibliography of poetry in English translation
Obituary in The Independent by Valentina Polukhina
Obituary in The Guardian by Sasha Dugdale

Russian women poets
1948 births
2010 deaths
20th-century Russian poets
20th-century Russian women writers